Church of the Holy Comforter may refer to the following churches:

 A church in the Episcopal Diocese of Atlanta, Georgia
 A church in Kenilworth, Illinois
 An 1888 church in Lutherville, Maryland
 Church of the Holy Comforter (Brownsville, Minnesota)
 Church of the Holy Comforter (Poughkeepsie, New York)
 Church of the Holy Comforter, Staten Island, New York, now St. Alban's Episcopal Church (Staten Island), New York
 St. Athanasius Episcopal Church and Parish House and the Church of the Holy Comforter, Burlington, North Carolina
 A Recorded Texas Historic Landmark in Cleburne, Texas